Aki Shibata (芝田安希 Shibata Aki, born January 6, 1981) was a Japanese volleyball player who played for Toray Arrows. She served as captain of the team between 2008 and 2010. Toray announced that she retired in June 2010.

Clubs
 Kyoto Seian high school
 Unitika Fenics (1999–2000)
 Toray Arrows (2001–2010)

Awards

team 
2002 Kurowashiki All Japan Volleyball Championship -  Champion, with Toray Arrows
2004 Kurowashiki All Japan Volleyball Championship -  Champion, with Toray Arrows
2007 Domestic Sports Festival (Volleyball) -  Champion, with Toray Arrows
2007-2008 Empress's Cup -   Champion, with Toray Arrows
2007-2008 V.Premier League -  Champion, with Toray Arrows
2008 Domestic Sports Festival -  Runner-Up, with Toray Arrows
2008-2009 V.Premier League -  Champion, with Toray Arrows
2009 Kurowashiki All Japan Volleyball Championship -  Champion, with Toray Arrows
2009-2010 V.Premier League -  Champion, with Toray Arrows
2010 Kurowashiki All Japan Volleyball Championship -  Champion, with Toray Arrows

References

External links
Toray Arrows Women's Volleyball Team

Japanese women's volleyball players
Living people
People from Wakayama Prefecture
1981 births
People from Gobō, Wakayama